Etlingera barioensis is a monocotyledonous plant species described by Axel Dalberg Poulsen. Etlingera barioensis is part of the genus Etlingera and the family Zingiberaceae. No subspecies are listed in the Catalog of Life.

References 

barioensis